Craig Lancaster (born 1970) is an American writer and journalist, best known for his novels 600 Hours of Edward, its sequel, Edward Adrift, and The Summer Son. His other notable works include a short story collection as well as numerous articles and essays produced during his career as a newspaper writer and editor. The author was lauded as "one of Montana's most important writers."

Lancaster's works are set against the backdrop of the contemporary American West, specifically Montana, where he lives and writes. His prose has been described as deeply emotional and deceptively direct, centering on intense characters who navigate obstacles and relationships in ways that are simultaneously humorous and poignant. His literary influences include Hemingway, Steinbeck, Stegner, and Doig.

Biography 

Craig Lancaster was born in Lakewood, Washington, on February 9, 1970. He was adopted by  a Wyoming couple who met in Billings, Montana, where he would eventually settle and launch his career as a novelist. After his parents divorced in the early 1970s, his mother remarried and moved Craig to suburban Fort Worth, Texas.
 
His step-father, a longtime sportswriter for the Fort Worth Star-Telegram, had a tremendous impact on Lancaster's formative years by encouraging his early interest in writing. Lancaster's fascination with the "Western identity" was also rooted in his childhood, as he traveled extensively during summer vacations to visit his father, who followed work in Western oil fields. Lancaster describes his early memories of Montana as "vast, beautiful, [and] overwhelming," and knew that he "wanted to be a part of it."

Lancaster attended the University of Texas at Arlington, and subsequently made his foray into "The West" of his early imagination via a series of journalistic assignments that led him from Texas to Alaska, Kentucky, Ohio, California, Washington, and eventually, Montana. In 2006, Lancaster moved to Montana, where he married and subsequently divorced in 2015. Lancaster married fellow novelist Elisa Lorello in 2016. His work as a writer and editor has appeared in the Fort Worth Star-Telegram, the San Jose Mercury News, The Billings Gazette, Magic City Magazine. He also serves as design director of Montana Quarterly, in addition to being a frequent contributor.

Major works

Novels
600 Hours of Edward (Riverbend Publishing, 2009)
The Summer Son (Lake Union Publishing, 2011)
Edward Adrift (Lake Union Publishing, 2013)
The Fallow Season of Hugo Hunter (Lake Union Publishing, 2014)
This Is What I Want (Lake Union Publishing, 2015)
Edward Unspooled (Missouri Breaks Press, 2016)
Julep Street (Missouri Breaks Press, 2017)
You, Me, & Mr. Blue Sky, co-author with Elisa Lorello (Lancarello Enterprises, 2019)

Short stories
Quantum Physics and The Art of Departure (Missouri Breaks Press, 2011), republished in 2016 as The Art of Departure

Non-fiction
Past-due Pastorals: Memories and Observations of a Mind Adrift in the West (2009)

Awards and recognition 
2009 Montana Honor Book, 600 Hours of Edward 
2010 High Plains Award Recipient, "Best First Book," 600 Hours of Edward
2010 Utah Book Award Finalist, The Summer Son 
2012 Independent Publishers Book Award, Gold Medal, "Best Regional Fiction," Quantum Physics and The Art of Departure 
2012 High Plains Award Finalist, Quantum Physics and The Art of Departure
2014 Kindle First Selection, The Fallow Season of Hugo Hunter
2016 High Plains Book Award Fiction Finalist, This Is What I Want
2017 International Book Awards Finalist, Edward Unspooled

References

External links 

1970 births
Writers from Billings, Montana
People from Fort Worth, Texas
People from Lakewood, Washington
Writers from Montana
Novelists from Texas
Novelists from Washington (state)
Living people
University of Texas at Arlington alumni
American male novelists
American columnists
American newspaper writers
American sportswriters
Sportswriters from Texas
Sportswriters from Washington (state)
American male journalists
21st-century American novelists
American adoptees
Journalists from Montana
American male short story writers
21st-century American short story writers
21st-century American male writers
21st-century American non-fiction writers